Sir John Lindsay Eric Smith  (3 April 1923 – 28 February 2007) was a British banker, Conservative Member of Parliament, and Lord Lieutenant of Berkshire. He was involved with many architectural, industrial and maritime conservation charities. He founded the Landmark Trust in 1965.

Early and private life
Smith was born in London, the son of Captain Evan Cadogan Eric Smith MC of Ashfold in Sussex and his wife, Beatrice Helen (née Williams). He was a scion of the Smith family: a family of bankers who founded the bank Smiths of Nottingham in the 1650s. The bank merged with the National Provincial Bank after the First World War and his father became its chairman. His mother was the daughter of Albert Williams and granddaughter of Sir George Williams, founder of the YMCA, and a great-granddaughter of Thomas Cook. His elder sister, Fortune, married Hugh FitzRoy, Earl of Euston (later 11th Duke of Grafton) in 1946; she was a Lady of the Bedchamber to Queen Elizabeth II from 1953 and 1966, and was the Mistress of the Robes from 1967 until her death 3 December 2021.

Smith was educated at Eton, where he was Captain of the Oppidans and won the Rosebery Prize for History. He joined the Fleet Air Arm in 1942 and trained as an observer at HMS Daedalus. He served in the Second World War in a Fairey Swordfish squadron in the Mediterranean and the Atlantic, then as a liaison officer to the US Ninth Air Force, and then with a squadron of Fairey Barracuda in the North Atlantic. He flew as a navigator in an operation to dive-bomb the German battleship Tirpitz in Kvænangen fjord in July 1944. He joined the aircraft carrier , and served in the Far East with 845 Naval Air Squadron, flying Grumman Avengers. He was in Ceylon at the end of the War.

After the War, he read history at New College, Oxford, where he later became an honorary fellow in 1979. He met his future wife, Christian Carnegy, in Oxford, where she was reading English.  They married in 1952.

The couple had two sons and three daughters:
Serena Mary Smith (married The Rt. Hon Nicholas Soames, Baron Soames of Fletching, son of Christopher Soames, Baron Soames)
Bartholomew Evan Eric Smith (born 1 February 1955; founder of the Amber Foundation and West London Aero Club, killer of footballer Peter Houseman)
Adam Carnegy Eric Smith (born 1953)
Dido Smith
Emma Smith, who pre-deceased him

Smith owned a property at No. 1, Smith Square, in his former constituency. However, he resided at Shottesbrooke Park, near Maidenhead in Berkshire, the ancient home of the Vansittart family which he inherited from his father's second cousin in 1962.

He died in Windsor. He was survived by his wife, their two sons, and two of their three daughters.

Financial and political career
He followed the family tradition of being a director of Coutts and Co, the private bank and a subsidiary of National Provincial, in 1950. He was the ninth generation of Smiths to work in the bank. He remained a director for 43 years, until 1993.

He also joined the boards of many other companies, including Rolls-Royce Limited, the Ottoman Bank and the Financial Times. He was also a deputy-governor of Royal Exchange Assurance. He was awarded the OBE in 1964.

He was a Conservative politician. After the death of the Speaker of the House of Commons, Sir Harry Hylton Foster in 1965, Smith was elected to succeed him in the subsequent by-election as Member of Parliament for the Cities of London and Westminster. Smith served until he stood down in 1970. He was appointed a CBE in 1975.

He served as High Steward of Maidenhead, and as Lord-Lieutenant of Berkshire from 1975 to 1978. He was knighted in 1988 and became a Companion of Honour in 1994.

He greatly enjoyed travelling, and claimed to be the first man to visit all of the explorers' huts in Antarctica.

Conservation
Smith served on committees of the National Trust from 1952 to 1995, and was deputy chairman from 1980 to 1995. He assisted financially with repairs to Barlaston Hall, damaged by subsidence due to coal mining. He also served on the Standing Committee for Museums and Galleries from 1958 to 1966, the Historic Buildings Council from 1971 to 1978, the Redundant Churches Fund from 1972 to 1974, and the National Heritage Memorial Fund from 1980 to 1982.

He founded the Manifold Trust in 1962, to raise money for charity by buying long leases close to the date of their expiry. The rather speculative venture was very successful, producing a "cataract of gold" which funded many of his charitable interests, including the Landmark Trust, which he and Lady Smith founded three years later, and which still operates from their estate at Shottesbrooke. Sir John identified and acquired properties for restoration, while Lady Smith supervised their fitting out, commissioning soft furnishings for each inspired by objects or design features associated with the buildings.

He was involved in canal restoration through his friendship with L. T. C. Rolt, and was a driving force behind the preservation of HMS Belfast, HMS Warrior and SS Great Britain.

References

Obituary, The Independent, 1 March 2007
 Obituary, The Daily Telegraph, 3 March 2007
Obituary, The Times, 3 March 2007
Obituary, The Guardian, 10 March 2007

1923 births
2007 deaths
John
Commanders of the Order of the British Empire
People educated at Eton College
Alumni of New College, Oxford
Fellows of New College, Oxford
Conservative Party (UK) MPs for English constituencies
Landmark Trust
Lord-Lieutenants of Berkshire
Knights Bachelor
Members of the Order of the Companions of Honour
People from Shottesbrooke
UK MPs 1964–1966
UK MPs 1966–1970
Politics of the City of London
Politics of the City of Westminster
British waterways activists
Fleet Air Arm personnel of World War II
United States Army Air Forces personnel of World War II
Fleet Air Arm aviators